Gideon Winans Allen (March 28, 1835 – February 28, 1912), was a member of the Wisconsin State Assembly.

Biography
Gideon Winans Allen was born in New London Township, Ohio on March 28, 1835. He moved to Trempealeau, Wisconsin in 1856 and to Madison, Wisconsin the following year. Allen graduated from what is now the University of Wisconsin-Madison in 1862 and from the University of Michigan Law School in 1864. After graduating, Allen practiced law in Madison, Sturgeon Bay, Wisconsin, and Carthage, Missouri.

Allen married Annie M. Cox (1840–1895) on May 16, 1865. They had five children.

He died in Sturgeon Bay on February 12, 1912.

Political career
Allen was a member of the Wisconsin Assembly in 1872. He had previously been an unsuccessful candidate in 1869. In addition, Allen was District Attorney of Door County, Wisconsin, City Attorney of Carthage and of Sturgeon Bay and Clerk of the Sturgeon Bay school board. He was a Democrat.

References

External links
 Allen Family Papers at the Newberry

People from New London, Ohio
People from Trempealeau, Wisconsin
Politicians from Madison, Wisconsin
Lawyers from Madison, Wisconsin
People from Sturgeon Bay, Wisconsin
People from Carthage, Missouri
Democratic Party members of the Wisconsin State Assembly
District attorneys in Wisconsin
Wisconsin city attorneys
School board members in Wisconsin
Missouri Democrats
Missouri lawyers
University of Wisconsin–Madison alumni
University of Michigan Law School alumni
1835 births
1912 deaths
19th-century American lawyers